7Hops.com Inc., doing business as Static Media, is an American internet company established in 2012 based in Indianapolis. It operates ZergNet, a content recommendation business.

ZergNet 
Established around 2011, ZergNet has been compared to Outbrain, Adblade, Taboola and similar companies, and the fact that the site itself has become popular with some end users invited a comparison to BuzzFeed. Zergnet aims to distinguish itself from its competitors by focusing on high quality, less spammy offerings.

The company's investors include Mark Cuban and Greycroft Partners.

Owned or associated websites 
Static Media owns and promotes entertainment websites:

 Looper – film, television, and video game news
 Nicki Swift – celebrity gossip
 Mashed – food discussion
 The List – women's lifestyle
 /Film – film news
 Grunge – history, entertainment, science, and sports
 SlashGear – personal technology and digital lifestyle trends
 Health Digest – health news
 Tasting Table – food and recipes
 SVG – video game news and discussion
 House Digest – home and decor news
 Wrestling Inc – pro wrestling and combat sports

See also 
Contextual advertising

References

External links

Contextual advertising
Online advertising methods
Online advertising services and affiliate networks
Companies based in Indianapolis
Online mass media companies of the United States
Recommender systems
American companies established in 2012